Dom kulture Čačak (Anglicized: Cultural Center Čačak) is a cultural center located in Čačak, Serbia.

History
It was founded on 1 July 1971, as the cultural center of the city of Čačak, located on the main city's square.

Dom kulture Čačak is also the home to the largest ficus in the Balkans, which was planted in 1971 when the works on the facility started. Since 2003, it has been the protected as the "natural wealth of third degree". The venue is also a host of the annual animation film festival "Animanima" held in November.

Gallery

References

External links
 
 Filmski svet na Čačanski način at caglas.rs 

Event venues established in 1971
1971 establishments in Yugoslavia
Culture in Čačak
Serbian culture
Theatres in Serbia